The Academy Award for Best Original Screenplay is the Academy Award for the best screenplay not based upon previously published material. It was created in 1940 as a separate writing award from the Academy Award for Best Story. Beginning with the Oscars for 1957, the two categories were combined to honor only the screenplay.

See also the Academy Award for Best Adapted Screenplay, a similar award for screenplays that are adaptations of pre-existing material.

Superlatives
Woody Allen has the most nominations in this category with 16, and the most awards with 3 (for Annie Hall, Hannah and Her Sisters, and Midnight in Paris). Paddy Chayefsky and  Billy Wilder have also won three screenwriting Oscars: Chayefsky won two for Original Screenplay (The Hospital and Network) and one for Adapted Screenplay (Marty), while Wilder won one for Adapted Screenplay (The Lost Weekend, shared with Charles Brackett), and two for Original Screenplay (Sunset Boulevard, shared with Brackett and D.M. Marshman Jr., and The Apartment, shared with I. A. L. Diamond)

Woody Allen also holds the record as the oldest winner (76) for Midnight in Paris. Ben Affleck is the youngest winner (25) for Good Will Hunting, co-written with Matt Damon (27).

Richard Schweizer was the first to win for a foreign-language film, Marie-Louise. Other winners for a non-English screenplay include Albert Lamorisse, Pietro Germi, Claude Lelouch, Pedro Almodóvar, Bong Joon-ho and Han Jin-won. Lamorisse is additionally the only person to win or even be nominated for Best Original Screenplay for a short film (The Red Balloon, 1956).

Muriel Box (The Seventh Veil was the first woman to win in this category; she shared the award with her husband, Sydney Box. The Boxes are also the first of two married couples to win in this category; Earl W. Wallace and Pamela Wallace (Witness) are the others.

In 1996, Joel Coen and Ethan Coen became the only siblings to win in this category (for Fargo). Francis Ford Coppola (Patton, 1970)  and Sofia Coppola (Lost in Translation, 2003) are the only father-daughter pair to win.

Preston Sturges was nominated for two different films in the same year (1944): Hail the Conquering Hero and The Miracle of Morgan's Creek. Oliver Stone achieved the same distinction in 1986, for Platoon and Salvador. Maurice Richlin and Stanley Shapiro were nominated in 1959 for both Operation Petticoat and Pillow Talk and won for the latter.

Jordan Peele became the first and only African-American to win in this category for 2017's Get Out.

Bong Joon-ho and Han Jin-won became the first Asian writers to win either Screenplay award, for 2019's Parasite.

Winners and nominees
Winners are listed first in colored row, followed by the other nominees.

1940s

1950s

1960s

1970s

1980s

1990s

2000s

2010s

2020s

Multiple wins and nominations

Multiple wins

Multiple nominations

Age superlatives

See also
 Academy Award for Best Story
 Golden Globe Award for Best Screenplay
 BAFTA Award for Best Original Screenplay
 Independent Spirit Award for Best Screenplay
 Critics' Choice Movie Award for Best Screenplay
 List of Big Five Academy Award winners and nominees
 Writers Guild of America Award for Best Original Screenplay

Notes

References

Original Screenplay

Screenwriting awards for film
Awards established in 1940